Richland is a historic building located in Church Hill, Jefferson County, Mississippi.

Location
It is located off the Mississippi Highway 553.

Overview
It was built in the 1840s by Robert Cox. His wife has inherited the land from her grandfather, Colonel Thomas M. Green, Jr. (1758–1813), the owner of the Springfield Plantation in Fayette, Mississippi. The architectural style is Greek Revival. It is white, and made of bricks and timber. The front door has Corinthian pilasters on each side.

It has been listed on the National Register of Historic Places since July 5, 1984.

References

Houses on the National Register of Historic Places in Mississippi
Houses in Jefferson County, Mississippi
Greek Revival houses in Mississippi
National Register of Historic Places in Jefferson County, Mississippi